Sophie Polkamp (born 2 August 1984 in Groningen) is a Dutch field hockey player, who played as defender for Dutch club Stichtse Cricket en Hockey Club and later for Amsterdamsche Hockey & Bandy Club (AHBC).

Polkamp also plays for the Netherlands national team and she was part of the Dutch squad that became world champions at the 2006 Women's Hockey World Cup and which won the 2007 Champions Trophy.

At the 2008 Summer Olympics in Beijing she won an Olympic gold medal with the Dutch national team, beating China in the final 2–0. Polkamp was also a gold medallist in the 2012 London Olympic Games, where the Netherlands beat Argentina, also 2–0. She announced her retirement from international competition on 3 June 2013, shortly after the AHBC had been Dutch champions.

References

External links
 

1984 births
Living people
Dutch female field hockey players
Field hockey players at the 2008 Summer Olympics
Field hockey players at the 2012 Summer Olympics
Medalists at the 2008 Summer Olympics
Medalists at the 2012 Summer Olympics
Olympic field hockey players of the Netherlands
Olympic gold medalists for the Netherlands
Olympic medalists in field hockey
Sportspeople from Groningen (city)
Female field hockey defenders
SCHC players
Amsterdamsche Hockey & Bandy Club players
20th-century Dutch women
21st-century Dutch women